Damnation's Prophecy is the first full length studio album by the blackened death metal band Abominator. It was released on Necropolis records in 1999. It was also re-released on Merciless Records, on LP format, in late 1999.

Track listing
Intro – Filthy Spirit Antichrist – 3:50
Debauchery (The Sinners Hammer) – 4:32
Damnation's Prophecy – 5:47
Intro – War Worship – 4:27
Activate the Anarchus – 5:42
The Conqueror Possessed – 5:58
Unholy Consecration – 6:25
Ode to Morbid Pleasure – 7:21
Luciferian Path to Destruction – 6:25
Sepulchral Vomit – Outro – 6:06

References

External links
Homepage

[ Release] at Allmusic

1999 debut albums
Abominator albums